Zuhair Al-Jezairy sometimes referred to as Zuhair Al Jazairy (born 1945 in Najaf, Iraq) is an Iraqi journalist, currently editor in chief of Aswat al-Iraq news agency  and part of the Iraqi Journalist Union, he was the previous editor in chief of the daily Arabic newspaper Al Mahda, he has also written several publications and has worked on various documentaries.

He studied German literature in Baghdad and since 1968, he has worked as a journalist in Baghdad, Beirut and London.

References

1945 births
Living people
Iraqi journalists
People from Najaf